Arnoglossum album, the Bay County Indian plantain, is a rare Florida species of plants in the sunflower family, first described to modern science in 1998. It has been found only in Bay and Gulf Counties in the Florida Panhandle.

Arnoglossum album is a plant growing up to 100 cm (40 inches) tall. Flower heads are white, occasionally with a pink tinge. The species grows in poorly drained acidic soils.

References

External links

photo of herbarium specimen from University of Florida Herbarium, paratype of Arnoglossum album

Senecioneae
Endemic flora of Florida
Plants described in 1998